Supreme Sanction is a 1999 action crime thriller film directed by John Terlesky and starring Michael Madsen, Kristy Swanson, and David Dukes. The film premiered on HBO on April 9, 1999. It uses stock footage from a 1998 film Airborne.

Plot summary
A secret government unit, Section Alpha, leads an enemy pilot to attack army helicopters during a patrol, killing a female soldier. A television reporter investigates to uncover the truth but the unit wants him killed too, so it sends a skilled assassin. She deliberately misfires a shot when she sees him with his daughter, making her Alpha's next target, as she recalls the fatal hits on a general who has known all about the attack. After saving his life, she joins him to fight back.

Cast
 Michael Madsen as Dalton
 Kristy Swanson as Jenna
 David Dukes as Jordan McNamara
 Ron Perlman as The Director
 Tommy "Tiny" Lister Jr. as Lester
 Al Sapienza as Holman
 Donald Adeosun Faison as Marcus
 Holliston "Holli" Coleman as Bailey McNamara
 Teo as Ron, The Security Guard
 Dannon Green as Stebbins
 D.J. Berg as Henderson
 Marshall Manesh as Hawk Face Man

References

External links

1999 action thriller films
1999 crime thriller films
1999 films
American action thriller films
American crime thriller films
American films about revenge
CineTel Films films
Films about assassinations
Films about journalists
Girls with guns films
1990s English-language films
Films directed by John Terlesky
1990s American films